{{safesubst:#invoke:RfD||2=WaveLight|month = February
|day = 28
|year = 2023
|time = 08:52
|timestamp = 20230228085206

|content=
REDIRECT Alcon

}}